Bivona is an Italian comune in the Province of Agrigento, Sicily.

Geography
Bivona is located at the foot of Monti Sicani, in the mainland of Agrigento, on the boundary with the province of Palermo. The communal territory is crossed by the Alba stream, now hidden, which flows into the Magazzolo.

History

Main sights 
The 14th century Mother Church (13th century), of which today only the portal remains.
Church of Santa Rosalia
Ducal Palace (16th century)
Remains of the Castello di Bivona and the walls of Bivona

Festivals and events
The Most important event in the Summertime of Bivona is the "Peach Festival", that is organized by the local government in the second half of August, and it is the main attraction of the small mountain town. The white Peach of Bivona, in fact, represents, besides a rare deliciousness, the most common cultivation in all region of Bivona.

Twin towns
 Collebeato, Italy, since 2004

References

External links
 Bivona On Line
 Bivona's Catholic Church
 Unofficial website